is an underground metro station located in Kōhoku-ku, Yokohama, Kanagawa Prefecture, Japan operated by the Yokohama Municipal Subway’s Blue Line (Line 3). It is 27.9 kilometers from the terminus of the Blue Line at Shōnandai Station.

History
Kishine-kōen Station was opened on March 14, 1985. Platform screen doors were installed in April 2007.

Lines
Yokohama Municipal Subway
Blue Line

Station layout
Kishine-kōen Station has a dual opposed side platforms serving two tracks, located three stories underground.

Platforms

Surrounding area
 Kishine Park

References
 Harris, Ken and Clarke, Jackie. Jane's World Railways 2008-2009. Jane's Information Group (2008).

External links
 Kishine-kōen Station (Blue Line) 

Railway stations in Kanagawa Prefecture
Railway stations in Japan opened in 1985
Blue Line (Yokohama)